William Edward Binney is a former intelligence official with the United States National Security Agency (NSA) and whistleblower. He retired on October 31, 2001, after more than 30 years with the agency.

He was a critic of his former employers during the George W. Bush administration, and later criticized the NSA's data-collection policies during the Barack Obama administration. He dissented from the view that Russia interfered with the 2016 US election. More specifically, he was critical of the view that Russia hacked the DNC server.

Biography 
Binney grew up in rural Pennsylvania and graduated with a Bachelor of Science degree in mathematics from the Pennsylvania State University in 1970. He said that he volunteered for the Army during the Vietnam era in order to select work that would interest him rather than be drafted and have no input. He was found to have strong aptitudes for mathematics, analysis, and code breaking, and served from 1965 to 1969 in the Army Security Agency before going to the NSA in 1970.

Binney was a Russia specialist and worked in the operations side of intelligence, starting as an analyst and ending as a Technical Director prior to becoming a geopolitical world Technical Director. In the 1990s, he co-founded a unit on automating signals intelligence with NSA research chief John Taggart. Binney's NSA career culminated as Technical Leader for intelligence in 2001. He has expertise in intelligence analysis, traffic analysis, systems analysis, knowledge management, and mathematics (including set theory, number theory, and probability).

After retiring from the NSA, he founded, together with fellow NSA whistleblower J. Kirk Wiebe, Entity Mapping, LLC, a private intelligence agency to market their analysis program to government agencies.

Whistleblowing 

In September 2002, he, along with J. Kirk Wiebe and Edward Loomis, asked the U.S. Defense Department Inspector General (DoD IG) to investigate the NSA for allegedly wasting "millions and millions of dollars" on Trailblazer, a system intended to analyze mass collection of data carried on communications networks such as the Internet. Binney had been one of the inventors of an alternative system, ThinThread, which was shelved when Trailblazer was chosen instead. Binney has also been publicly critical of the NSA for spying on U.S. citizens, saying of its expanded surveillance after the September 11, 2001 attacks that "it's better than anything that the KGB, the Stasi, or the Gestapo and SS ever had" as well as noting Trailblazer's ineffectiveness and unjustified high cost compared to the far less intrusive ThinThread. He was furious that the NSA hadn't uncovered the 9/11 plot and stated that intercepts it had collected but not analyzed likely would have garnered timely attention with his leaner more focused system.

Post-NSA career 
After he left the NSA in 2001, Binney was one of several people investigated as part of an inquiry into a 2005 exposé by The New York Times on the agency's warrantless eavesdropping program. Binney was cleared of wrongdoing after three interviews with FBI agents beginning in March 2007, but in early July 2007, in an unannounced early morning raid, a dozen agents armed with rifles appeared at his house, one of whom entered the bathroom and pointed his gun at Binney, who was taking a shower. The FBI confiscated a desktop computer, disks, and personal and business records. The NSA revoked his security clearance, forcing him to close a business he ran with former colleagues at a loss of a reported $300,000 in annual income. The FBI raided the homes of Wiebe and Loomis, as well as House Intelligence Committee staffer Diane Roark, the same morning. Several months later the FBI raided the home of then still active NSA executive Thomas Andrews Drake who had also contacted DoD IG, but anonymously with confidentiality assured. The Assistant Inspector General, John Crane, in charge of the Whistleblower Program, suspecting his superiors provided confidential information to the United States Department of Justice (DOJ), challenged them, was eventually forced from his position, and subsequently himself became a public whistleblower. The punitive treatment of Binney, Drake, and the other whistleblowers also led Edward Snowden to go public with his revelations rather than report through the internal whistleblower program. In 2012, Binney and his co-plaintiffs went to federal court to retrieve the confiscated items.

Allegations on intercepts 
Binney is known for making the claim that the NSA collects and stores information about every U.S. communication. Binney was invited as a witness by the NSA commission of the German Bundestag. On July 3, 2014 Der Spiegel wrote, he said that the NSA wanted to have information about everything. In Binney's view this is a totalitarian approach, which had previously been seen only in dictatorships. Binney stated that the goal was to control people. Meanwhile, he said that it is possible in principle to monitor the whole population, abroad and in the U.S., which in his view contradicts the United States Constitution.

In August 2014, Binney was among the signatories of an open letter by the group Veteran Intelligence Professionals for Sanity to German chancellor Angela Merkel in which they urged the Chancellor to be suspicious of U.S. intelligence regarding the alleged invasion by Russia in Eastern Ukraine. In the open letter, the group said:
[A]ccusations of a major Russian "invasion" of Ukraine appear not to be supported by reliable intelligence. Rather, the "intelligence" seems to be of the same dubious, politically "fixed" kind used 12 years ago to "justify" the U.S.-led attack on Iraq.

Russian Interference in the 2016 election 

Binney has said he voted for Trump in the 2016 presidential election, calling Hillary Clinton a "war monger".

Binney has asserted that the U.S. intelligence community's assessment that Russia interfered in the 2016 presidential election is false, and that the Democratic National Committee e-mails were leaked by an insider instead. An investigation by Duncan Campbell later detailed how Binney had been persuaded by a pro-Kremlin disinformant that the theft of the DNC emails was an inside job, and not the work of Russian agents (contrary to the findings of the US intelligence community). The disinformation agent altered metadata in the files released by Guccifer 2.0 (whom the US intelligence community identifies as a Russian military intelligence operation) to make it appear as if the documents came from a computer in the Eastern United States, not Russia. (Specifically, the local time zone of the computer's system clock was changed to UTC−05:00.) Binney appeared on Fox News at least ten times between September 2016 and November 2017 to promote this theory. Binney said that the "intelligence community wasn't being honest here". He has been a frequent guest on RT and Fox News and has been frequently cited on Breitbart News. In October 2017, Binney met with CIA Director Mike Pompeo at the behest of President Trump to discuss his theory. However, on meeting Campbell and analysing the material again, Binney changed his position: he said there was “no evidence to prove where the download/copy was done”, and that the files he had based his previous assessment were “manipulated” and a “fabrication”.

Role in apparent release of the Nunes Memo

On January 23, 2018, Binney made an appearance on InfoWars in connection with the Nunes memo, a Congressional document alleging irregularities in the application of the FISA Act, which at that time was not publicly available although its potential release was a topic of public debate. During the show, host Alex Jones announced that Binney had been able to provide him with the actual memo, and the purported leaked document was shown on air. However, this was in fact a public document that had been available on the website of the Office of the Director of National Intelligence since at least May 2017. The actual Nunes memo was released February 2, 2018.

Claims of fraud in the 2020 election 
After Joe Biden won the 2020 election and Donald Trump refused to concede, Binney doubted the official results and claimed his belief that there had been large-scale voter fraud. One of Binney's tweets alleging missing votes was based on a mistaken conflation between eligible voters and an outdated number of registered voters; this was cited in an article by the Gateway Pundit, which in turn was promoted by Trump.

Documentary film 
Binney's story is recounted in A Good American, a documentary film.

See also

 MAINWAY
 PRISM (surveillance program)
 Mark Klein
 Thomas Tamm
 Russ Tice
 Perry Fellwock
 Targeted surveillance
 Citizenfour – a 2014 documentary
 A Good American – a 2015 documentary

References

External links

 The Future of Freedom: A Feature Interview with NSA Whistleblower William Binney, February 2015
 William.Binney.HOPE.9.KEYNOTE.Part1, related to ThinThread development
 William.Binney.HOPE.9.KEYNOTE.Part2, related to ThinThread development
 "Who's Watching the N.S.A. Watchers?: Giving In to the Surveillance State", Shane Harris op-ed in The New York Times, 22 August 2012
 "The National Security Agency's Domestic Spying Program", Laura Poitras opinion piece in The New York Times, 22 August 2012
 'The Program' – a video by Laura Poitras for The New York Times, 22 August 2012.
 
 

 Web site for documentary A Good American

American whistleblowers
Living people
National Security Agency people
National Security Agency cryptographers
Eberly College of Science alumni
Privacy activists
1943 births